Matoba may refer to:

Matoba (surname), a Japanese surname
Matoba Station, a railway station in Kawagoe, Saitama Prefecture, Japan
Matoba Dam, a dam in Maharashtra, India